The Ministry of Transport (MOT) is the government ministry responsible for governing  rail transport, road transport, water transport, maritime transport, and air transport in Vietnam.  The Ministry is located in Hoan Kiem, Hanoi.

Organisation
The technical, administrative and educational work of the Ministry is organised into various agencies, departments, schools and enterprises, including:

Specialised agencies
 Vietnam Road Administration    
 Vietnam Inland Waterways Administration    
 Vietnam National Maritime Bureau    
 Vietnam Register: governs seagoing vessels, rivergoing vessels, offshore installations, including petroleum industry rigs, industrial installations and motor vehicles of Vietnam    
 Transport Construction Quality Control and Management Bureau

Administrative agencies

Industrial research institutes
 Research Institute for Transport Science and Technology (RITST)
 Transport Development and Strategy Institute (TDSI)

Schools
 Vietnam Aviation Academy (VAA)
 Vietnam Maritime University (VINAMARU)
 Ho Chi Minh City University of Transportation (UT-HCMC)
 University of Transport Technology (UTT)
 School for Training Cards and Civil Servants of the Transport Sector
 Transport College
 Transport Technical and Professional School No. 1
 Transport Technical and Professional School No. 2
 Transport Technical and Professional School No. 3
 Transport Technical and Professional School for Cuu Long Delta Area
 Transport Vocational School Area I
 Transport Vocational School Area II
 Transport Vocational School Area III

Other
 Transport Health Department
 Transport Information Centre
 Transport Newspaper
 Transport Journal
 Transport Publishing House

Enterprises   
 Thang Long Construction Corporation    
 Civil Engineering Construction Corporation No. 1 (CIENCO 1)    
 Civil Engineering Construction Corporation No. 4 (CIENCO 4)    
 Civil Engineering Construction Corporation No. 5 (CIENCO 5)         
 Civil Engineering Construction Corporation No. 6 (CIENCO 6)
 Civil Engineering Construction Corporation No. 8 (CIENCO 8)
 Transport Industry Corporation (TRANSINCO)
 Vietnam Waterway Construction Corporation (VINAWACO)
 Transport Engineering Design Incorporation (TEDI)
 NguyenMy Co.,Ltd, International Freight Forwarder 
 Northern Inland Waterway Transport Corporation
 Southern Inland Waterway Transport Corporation
 Trading and Engineering Construction Corporation (TRAENCO)
 Transport Service Company No. 2
 Vietnam Freight Forwarding Company (VINAFCO)
 Saigon Transport Service Company
 Labor Oversea Deployment Corporation (LOD)
 Vietnam Shipping and Chartering Corporation (VIETFRACHT)
 Transport Mechanical Corporation No. 2
 Transport Material Engineering and Construction Corporation (TRANSMECCO)
 Southern Transport Engineering Design Incorporation (TEDI SOUTH)
 Transport Import-Export and Investment Cooperation Corporation (TRACIMEXCO)

List of ministers
This is a list of Ministers of Transport of the Socialist Republic of Vietnam

 August 1945-March 1945 : Đào Trọng Kim
 March 1945- September 1955: Trần Đăng Khoa
 September 1955 – 1957: Nguyễn Văn Trân
 1957–1960: Nguyễn Hữu Mai
 1960– March 1974: Phan Trọng Tuệ
 March 1974 – 1976: Dương Bạch Liên
 1976–February 1980: Phan Trọng Tuệ
 February 1980– April 1982: Đinh Đức Thiện
 April 1982– June 1986: Đồng Sĩ Nguyên
 June 1986– November 1996: Bùi Danh Lưu
 November 1996 – 2002: Lê Ngọc Hoàn
 2002– June 2006: Đào Đình Bình
 June 2006– 3 August 2011: Hồ Nghĩa Dũng
 3 August 2011– 6 February 2016: Đinh La Thăng
 6 February 2016– 25 October 2017: Nguyễn Hồng Trường
 26 October 2017– 21 October 2022: Nguyễn Văn Thể
 21 October 2017– present: Nguyễn Văn Thắng

See also
 Government of Vietnam
 Transport in Vietnam

References

External links
 
 Ministry of Transport, Organisation directory

Transport
Governmental office in Hanoi
Transport organizations based in Vietnam
Vietnam